Susleni, Orhei district, Moldova is a village in Orhei District, Moldova.

References

Villages of Orhei District
Orgeyevsky Uyezd